Pablo César Aimar (born 3 November 1979) is an Argentine former professional footballer and current assistant coach of the Argentina national team, which won the 2022 World Cup.

Aimar played as an attacking midfielder. After starting his senior career at River Plate in 1996, he amassed La Liga totals of 215 games and 32 goals over eight seasons with Valencia and Real Zaragoza between 2001 and 2008, before spending five years in Portugal with Benfica, winning nine major titles between the three teams.

Aimar earned 52 caps for the Argentina national team over ten years, representing the nation in two FIFA World Cups and two Copa América tournaments, as well as a FIFA Confederations Cup. He reached the final of the 2005 Confederations Cup and the 2007 Copa América with the Argentine national side.

Playing career

Club career

River Plate
Born in Río Cuarto, Córdoba, Aimar's football career begun in earnest when he was offered the chance to play for Estudiantes de Río Cuarto by youth coach Alfie Mercado. He trained with the club's academy three times a week and it was there that he was spotted by River Plate who offered the chance to join their own academy. Aimar's father initially prevented him from joining River as he felt he was too young to be playing football, but relented after manager Daniel Passarella personally asked him to allow his son to play. Having turned down the opportunity to attend medical school to pursue a career in football, Aimar made his debut for River on 11 August 1996 against Colón. His first goal for the club came on 20 February 1998 against Rosario Central. Aimar lifted five titles with River between 1996 and 2000, scoring 21 goals and recording 28 assists in 82 league appearances for the club, with his final appearance coming on 17 December 2000 in a 3–2 loss to Lanús.

Valencia
In January 2001, Spanish La Liga side Valencia signed Aimar from River for a club-record fee of €24 million (£13 million). He made his debut for the club the following month against Manchester United and drew praise from three-time Ballon d'Or winner Johan Cruyff for his performance after the match. The following weekend he scored on his La Liga debut, netting in a 2–0 away win over Las Palmas. Aimar immediately became a key figure in Valencia's midfield under Héctor Cúper and helped the club reach the 2001 UEFA Champions League final, where they lost to Bayern Munich on penalties.

In the season which followed, Cúper left for Internazionale, and was replaced by Rafael Benítez. Aimar appeared in a total of 33 league games and scored 4 goals as Valencia were crowned 2001–02 La Liga champions for the first time in 31 years, ending as the club's third-highest goalscorer across all competitions for the season. The season thereafter, Aimar jointly topped the Champions League assists table alongside Rui Costa of Milan with five assists to his name, this despite Valencia being eliminated at the quarter-final stage. The club endured further disappointment by ending the league season in fifth place.

The club's failures were soon forgotten, however, as Valencia completed a league and UEFA Cup double the following season. Despite making more than 30 appearances for the season and playing an influential role in the club's UEFA Cup triumph, Aimar was sidelined for large parts of the season in what was to set an injury-plagued tone to his career.

Following a breakdown between Benítez and Valencia's sporting director Jesús García Pitarch, the former left his position at the club and was replaced by Italian manager Claudio Ranieri for the 2004–05 season. A combination of injury concerns and tactical changes from the manager saw Aimar struggle under Ranieri and found himself being as employed as a substitute more frequently than before. The Italian departed the club in February and was replaced by Antonio López, who in turn was replaced by Quique Sánchez Flores for the following season. With Valencia in decline, Aimar decided to leave the club at the end of the 2005–06 season having amassed over 200 appearances for the club over the course of five-and-a-half seasons.

Zaragoza
In the summer of 2006, Aimar joined fellow top flight club Real Zaragoza on a four-year deal for a reported fee of €11 million, with the club describing the deal as the most important signing in the club's history. At Zaragoza, he was reunited with compatriot and former Valencia teammate Roberto Ayala, who himself had joined the club earlier in the month. Aimar made his league debut on 27 August in a 2–3 away loss against Deportivo de La Coruña and went on to make 32 appearances across all competitions, scoring five goals and helping the club to a sixth-place finish in the league. The following season was a disastrous one for Aimar and Zaragoza as the club, fraught with poor performances and financial mismanagement were relegated from La Liga. Zaragoza's relegation saw Aimar bring an end to his time in Aragon, having made 57 appearances during his two-season stay with the club. During his stint with Zaragoza, he obtained dual-Spanish nationality, having lived in the country since 2001.

Benfica

On 17 July 2008, Aimar signed a four-year contract with Portuguese side Benfica for a fee of €6.5 million. After struggling with injuries initially, he finished the campaign with a string of strong performances and was able to add a Taça da Liga title to his name.

In the 2009–10 season, Aimar was reunited with former River Plate teammate Javier Saviola, who was let go by Real Madrid following his own injury struggles. The two combined as double trequartista to support striker Óscar Cardozo alongside fellow Argentine Ángel Di María on the wing. The quartet formed the Primeira Liga's most dangerous attack, with Benfica scoring 78 goals on their way to a league and cup double.

Aimar had become a fan favourite at the Estádio da Luz but injuries continued to plague him, and his game time reduced in the coming seasons. In spite of this, he helped the club to its third and fourth consecutive Taça da Liga titles. On 6 June 2013, after 179 official appearances, 17 goals and 34 assists, Aimar announced he was leaving Benfica and thanked the club for "five wonderful years".

Johor Darul Ta'zim
On 7 August 2013, Tunku Ismail Ibrahim, the president of Malaysian club Johor Darul Ta'zim, confirmed that Aimar had signed a two-year contract with the team. Upon arrival, he became the highest paid player ever to feature in the Malaysia Super League. He made his debut in the league six months after signing, in a 2–0 win against Perak FA. Prior to making his debut, Aimar had previously played at the Larkin Stadium, home of Johor, before with Argentina in the 1997 Youth World Cup. He ultimately made 8 appearances for the club and scored two goals before a spate of injuries resulted in him being released on 21 April 2014. Aimar did earn a champions medal for his time with JDT, though, as the club went on to lift the Super League title at the end of the season.

Return to River Plate
On 5 January 2015, Aimar returned to River Plate for the club's pre-season training, stating that he would sign with the club only if he could deal with the physical demand after having undergone surgeries to his heel and not having played since leaving Johor Darul Ta’zim in April 2014. On 31 May, he played as substitute in a home win against Rosario Central in the Primera División. Aimar announced his retirement on 14 July 2015 after River Plate coach Marcelo Gallardo informed him that he was not included in the club's squad for the semi-final stage of the Copa Libertadores. Gallardo said Aimar was "suffering" and had struggled with injuries through the pre-season.

Estudiantes de Río Cuarto
On 16 January 2018, Aimar played in a friendly match for his youth club Estudiantes de Río Cuarto. After the match, he announced that he would be joining the squad ahead of the Copa Argentina fixture against Sportivo Belgrano on 23 January, in order to fulfill his wish of making an official appearance for the club where he began and spent eight years.

The Copa Argentina match took place at Estudiantes' home stadium Estadio Ciudad de Río Cuarto. Aimar was picked in the starting line up and wore the captain's armband, coming close to opening the score with a shot that was parried by the goalkeeper, before getting subbed off in the 50th minute. The match ended in a goalless draw, which was not enough to see Estudiantes through the next round after a 2–1 loss in the first leg. His brother Andrés was also in the line-up of Estudiantes. Afterwards, Aimar confirmed that he had no intention of making a definitive comeback and that this was indeed his farewell match from football.

International career
Aimar first represented Argentina at youth levels. Along with future senior team players Esteban Cambiasso and Juan Román Riquelme he won the 1997 FIFA World Youth Championship and went on to earn 52 senior caps following his debut in 1999, scoring eight international goals in total. He represented Argentina at the 1999 and 2007 editions of the Copa América, at the 2002 and 2006 FIFA World Cups, and at the 2005 FIFA Confederations Cup.

In the 2002 World Cup, for which he was picked ahead of Riquelme, Aimar appeared against England, subbing in for Juan Sebastián Verón in the 1–0 loss, which led coach Marcelo Bielsa to start him against Sweden at the latter's expense.

Aimar scored the last goal of the 2005 FIFA Confederations Cup during Argentina's 4–1 loss in the final to champions Brazil. He also appeared with the national side in the 2007 Copa América, scoring a goal in a 4–1 win against the United States in his team's opening group match of the competition; Argentina went on to reach the final of the tournament, losing out to Brazil once again, this time 0–3, with Aimar coming on as a second-half substitute for Cambiasso.

After several months in the sidelines, Aimar received another international callup in October 2009, for decisive 2010 World Cup qualifiers against Peru and Uruguay. In the match against the former he repaid the faith placed in him by coach Diego Maradona, assisting Gonzalo Higuaín for Argentina's opener with a through ball, in an eventual 2–1 win.

Style of play
An elegant, technically gifted and creative attacking midfielder with a small frame, Aimar was a right-footed player with a vast array of skills and an eye for goal. He excelled in a free role as an advanced playmaker where he was best able to utilise his dribbling skills, vision and passing ability to create chances for teammates and orchestrate attacking moves. Moreover, he was a free kick specialist. His skills and playing style saw him earn comparisons with Diego Maradona in his youth. Due to his talent and flamboyance, he was given the nicknames El Payaso (the clown) and El Mago (the wizard) throughout his career. As a youth, compatriot Lionel Messi stated in 2002 that Aimar was one of his biggest influences as a player. In addition to his playing ability, Aimar also drew praise for his leadership qualities; however, despite his talent, he struggled with injuries throughout his career.

Coaching career
Aimar was appointed as coach of the Argentina national under-17 football team in July 2017. His under-17 team won the South American U-17 Championship in 2019.
He was part of the Argentina managerial team who won the 2022 FIFA World Cup.

Personal life
Aimar's younger brother, Andrés, was also a professional footballer and a midfielder. He represented several teams in his country – starting his career at River Plate – also playing for a few months in Israel. In October 2022 Aimar's mother passed away.

Career statistics

Club
Sources:

International

International goals
Argentina score listed first, score column indicates score after each Aimar goal.

Managerial

Honours

Player
River Plate
 Primera División: 1997 Apertura, 1999 Apertura, 2000 Clausura
 Supercopa Sudamericana: 1997
 Recopa Sudamericana: Runner-up 1997

Valencia
 La Liga: 2001–02, 2003–04
 UEFA Cup: 2003–04
 UEFA Super Cup: 2004
 Supercopa de España: Runner-up 2002, 2004
 UEFA Champions League: Runner-up 2000–01

Benfica
 Primeira Liga: 2009–10
 Taça da Liga: 2008–09, 2009–10, 2010–11, 2011–12
 UEFA Europa League: Runner-up 2012–13
 Taça de Portugal: Runner-up 2012–13
 Supertaça Cândido de Oliveira: Runner-up 2010

Johor Darul Ta’zim
 Malaysian Super League: 2014

Argentina U17
 South American Under-17 Football Championship: Runner-up 1995
 FIFA U-17 World Cup: Third-place 1995

Argentina U20
 South American Youth Championship: 1997, 1999
 FIFA World Youth Championship: 1997

Argentina
 FIFA Confederations Cup: Runner-up 2005
 Copa América: Runner-up 2007

Individual
 FIFA World Youth Championship Bronze Ball: 1997
 South American Team of the Year: 1999, 2000
 UEFA Champions League top assist provider: 2002–03
 Trofeo EFE: 2005–06
 Cosme Damião Awards – Footballer of the Year: 2011

Manager 
Argentina U-17
 South American U-17 Championship: 2019

References

External links
 
 CiberChe stats and bio 
 
 
 
 
 

1979 births
Living people
People from Río Cuarto, Córdoba
Argentine people of Spanish descent
Naturalised citizens of Spain
Argentine emigrants to Spain
Argentine footballers
Association football midfielders
Argentine Primera División players
Estudiantes de Río Cuarto footballers
Club Atlético River Plate footballers
La Liga players
Valencia CF players
UEFA Cup winning players
Real Zaragoza players
Primeira Liga players
S.L. Benfica footballers
Malaysia Super League players
Johor Darul Ta'zim F.C. players
Argentina youth international footballers
Argentina international footballers
1999 Copa América players
2002 FIFA World Cup players
2005 FIFA Confederations Cup players
2006 FIFA World Cup players
2007 Copa América players
Argentine expatriate footballers
Expatriate footballers in Spain
Expatriate footballers in Portugal
Expatriate footballers in Malaysia
Argentine expatriate sportspeople in Spain
Argentine expatriate sportspeople in Portugal
Argentine expatriate sportspeople in Malaysia
Sportspeople from Córdoba Province, Argentina